Wolfgang Männel (October 18, 1937 in Falkenstein, Saxony - September 26, 2006) was an influential German professor of Business Administration.

Academic contributions 

Männel was born as the son of the German entrepreneur Max Rudolf Männel and his wife Liska. He graduated at the University of Mannheim. In 1972 Männel became professor of Business Administration at the University of Frankfurt, in 1973 at the University of Dortmund and in 1982 at the University of Erlangen-Nuremberg.

He influenced the German Business Administration a lot with works about cost accounting. His literature is stilled used by almost every German student in this academic field.

External links 
 Prof. Wolfgang Männel (German)

1937 births
2006 deaths
People from Falkenstein, Saxony
University of Mannheim alumni
Academic staff of Goethe University Frankfurt
Academic staff of the Technical University of Dortmund
Academic staff of the University of Erlangen-Nuremberg